The Lincoln Township Mausoleum, also known as the Zearing Mausoleum, is a historic building located in Zearing, Iowa, United States.  It is situated along the western edge of Zearing Cemetery, near a windbreak of trees.  The mausoleum is a single-story concrete structure, rectangular in shape, that was completed in 1912.  Most of the building is capped with a gable roof, but the front has a series of three flat roofs.  The exterior walls are covered with stucco, painted white.  It combines elements of the Mission, Late Gothic Revival, and Neoclassical styles. The interior features a central hall with 100 crypts on both sides.  They are stacked in four horizontal rows, and are faced with marble panels.  The building is significant for its "monolithic concrete construction used to build a public mausoleum," which is a rarity in Iowa.  The mausoleum was listed on the National Register of Historic Places in 2007.

References

External links

Buildings and structures completed in 1912
Buildings and structures in Story County, Iowa
National Register of Historic Places in Story County, Iowa